Daniel Augusto Macedo de Melo e Pinto (born 10 May 1958), better known as Dani Pinto,  is a football manager who coaches SL Benfica de Macau and a retired footballer who played as a defender. Born in Cape Verde prior to it becoming independent from Portugal, he has moved first to the metropole, where he played for Académica de Coimbra, and C.F. União de Coimbra. In early 1990s, he moved to Macau, which was Portuguese as well (now a special administrative region of China). Being there, he has played for Leng Ngan, G.D. Negro Rubro, G.D. Lam Pak, Kuan Tai, F.C. Porto de Macau and for the senior Macau national team. 

Since 2010 until 2012 he coached the F.C. Porto de Macau.

References

1958 births
Living people
Place of birth missing (living people)
Portuguese footballers
Portuguese people of Cape Verdean descent
Association football defenders
Macau footballers
Macau people of Cape Verdean descent
G.D. Lam Pak players
Macau international footballers
Macau football managers